Hypogymnia is a genus of foliose lichens in the family Parmeliaceae. They are commonly known as tube lichens, bone lichens, or pillow lichens. Most species lack rhizines (root-like attachment organs on the lower surface) that are otherwise common in members of the Parmeliaceae, and have swollen lobes that are usually hollow. Other common characteristics are relatively small spores and the presence of physodic acid and related lichen products. The lichens usually grow on the bark and wood of coniferous trees.

Hypogymnia was proposed by lichenologist William Nylander, first as a subgenus of Parmelia in 1881, and 15 years later as a distinct genus of two species, including the widespread and common type species, Hypogymnia physodes. It has since grown to about 90 recognized species. Hypogymnia has a centre of biodiversity in China, where many of its species are found.

Taxonomy
Hypogymnia was first created as subgenus of Parmelia by Finnish lichenologist William Nylander in 1881. He associated it with the species Parmelia physodem (which ultimately became the type species, Hypogymnia physodes), noting the lack of rhizines as the characteristic distinguishing it from Parmelia. Nylander later promoted it to generic status in 1896. At this time, the genus contained only two species: Hypogymnia pertusa (currently named Menegazzia terebrata) as well as the type species. For many decades afterwards, the genus did not have widespread recognition, as most lichenologists preferred to include the "hypogymnioid" lichens in the classic form genus Parmelia. In 1951 Hildur Krog considered the morphology and chemistry of this group of species to be distinctive and reinstated the genus Hypogymnia. Krog included four subgenera, including H. subg. Cavernularia and H. subg.Everniiformes. These later became accepted as distinct genera (the former only temporarily; see synonymy below), the latter under the name Pseudevernia.

In 1974, Krog published an account of three Northern Hemisphere Hypogymnia species that grow on acid rock in arctic and alpine habitats. These species, namely H.  atrofusca, H. intestiniformis, and H. oroarctica, make up the H. intestiniformis group. This biologically discontinuous assemblage of species was segregated from Hypogymnia by Trevor Goward under the genus name Brodoa in 1986. It differs from Hypogymnia in its compact medulla, larger spores and different cortical structure.

Hypogymnia is classified in the Parmeliaceae. The family Hypogymniaceae has been proposed in the past to contain the genus and other similar hypogymnioid lichens, but this taxonomic arrangement has not been widely accepted by other taxonomists. For example, Krog argued that no critical characters had been suggested that could be used as a defining familial characteristic. In the Parmeliaceae, Hypogymnia belongs to the hypogymnioid clade  along with the genera Arctoparmelia, Brodoa, and Pseudevernia. All of these genera share the common characteristic of having a loosely compact medulla.

Hypogymnia lichens are commonly known as "tube lichens", "bone lichens", or "pillow lichens".

Synonymy
Synonyms of Hypogymnia are Cavernularia, created by Gunnar Degelius in 1937, and Ceratophyllum, created by Maurice Choisy in 1951. Cavernularia contained two hypogymnoid species, C. lophyrea and C. hultenii. This species pair has an array of pronounced but small depressions in the lower surface, instead of the smooth or irregularly wrinkled surface typical of Hypogymnia; Degelius called these minute cavities (about 0.1 mm diameter) "cavernulae". The two Cavernularia species are otherwise similar to Hypogymnia in terms of overall morphology, microstructure of the apothecia, and chemistry. Molecular analysis showed that Cavernularia needed to be subsumed into Hypogymnia in order for the latter genus to be monophyletic. This suggested synonymy had already been proposed several decades earlier by Veli Räsänen in 1943 and Hildur Krog in 1952, but not adopted by later authors, including Krog herself.

Description

Hypogymnia is a genus of medium to large foliose lichens. They are typically greenish grey to brownish grey in colour; some species are yellowish (from usnic acid). The thallus comprises more or less inflated but hollow (tube-like) lobes. These lobes often have a perforation at the tip. The colour of the ceiling of the tubes (the medullary surface) is dark brown or white, and is often used as a characteristic to distinguish between species. The lower surface of the tube is black with a smooth or wrinkled texture.

Rhizines are root-like attachment organs on the lower surface of a lichen thallus, made of elongated strands of hyphae; a shorter version of this attachment organ is called a hapter. Although many recent lichen floras and manuals describe Hypogymnia as lacking rhizines, a 2015 study challenges the universality of this assertion. In the study, researchers studied a large number of Hypogymnia collections, representing 72 species as well as 64 type specimens. They found that rhizines and hapters were occasionally present on the lower surface of 35 species. Two types of attachment organs are found: slender rhizines with fine and tapering tips (found in H. krogiae and H. subfarinacea), and the more common hapters, which are thick with broken tips. Both types are dark brown to black and usually the same colour as the lower surface. In all cases where these attachment organs are found, however, they are few in number and are sparsely distributed on the lower thallus surface.

The apothecia of Hypogymnia are lecanorine in form with a constricted base and are often raised or shaped like an urn. The apothecial discs are red-brown and typically concave. Ascospores are colourless, ellipsoid, and number eight per ascus. They are relatively small, less than 9 μm long. Pycnidia are black and appear as small dots on the surface of the lobes. The photobiont partner is trebouxioid–a green alga from the genus Trebouxia.

The cortex contains atranorin (responsible for the grey colour), while the medullae of most species have physodic acid, and some species contain other orcinol and beta-orcinol depsidones, including protocetraric acid and physodalic acid.

The genus Menegazzia contains species that could be confused with Hypogymnia; Menegazzia, however, has perforations on the upper lobe surface, unlike Hypogymnia. Other superficially similar genera, such as Brodoa and Allantoparmelia, can be distinguished from Hypogymnia by their solid lobes.

Habitat and distribution
Hypogymnia species usually grow on bark and wood, particular that of conifers. Less frequently, they are found on rock or mossy soil. The genus has been recorded on all continents except Antarctica. In tropical to subtropical locations, Hypogymnia appears to be restricted to high elevations, where temperatures are cooler. Seventeen species are recorded from the Himalayan region of India and Nepal, while 31 species are present in North America. In Mexico, it is relatively rare; of the 11 species recorded from there, only two are known from more than 10 collections, and only one, H. guadalupensis, is endemic to the country. Nine species occur in Europe. Southwestern China is a centre of biodiversity for the genus, as more than 40 species occur there. It is one of the few large Parmeliaceae genera that has its main distribution in the Northern Hemisphere.

Ecology
There are several lichenicolous fungi that are known to infect Hypogymnia species. Some of them parasitise specific lichens, such as Plectocarpon hypogymniae (on Hypogymnia bitteri), Lichenopeltella hypogymniae (on Hypogymnia zeylanica),  Muellerella antarctica (on Hypogymnia antarctica), Phacopsis cephalodioides (on Hypogymnia physodes). Others have a less specific host range, including Abrothallus prodiens, Epithamnolia xanthoriae, Minutoexcipula calatayudii, Trichonectria anisospora, Endophragmiella franconica, Cyphobasidium hypogymniicola, Tremella hypogymniae, and Tremella papuana. The thalli of Hypogymnia physodes are inhabited by various species of orbatid mites.

Uses
Hypogymnia physodes has been used as a biomonitor for several applications. Examples include monitoring atmospheric nitrogen and sulphur deposition in Norway, the accumulation of mercury downwind of chloralkali plant in Wisconsin, and pollution from several toxic heavy metal elements following the closure of a large mine waste dump close to Zlatna, Romania. It was also used to help evaluate the levels of radionuclides deposited in the environment after the East Urals (1957) and Chernobyl (1988) nuclear accidents. H. tubulosa is an indicator species of old-growth forests. In China, H. physodes and H. pseudoenteromorpha are used as raw materials in the preparation of litmus reagent.

In 15th-century Europe, Hypogymnia physodes was one component (in addition to Evernia prunastri and Pseudevernia furfuracea) of the popular drug "Lichen quercinus virdes". In Traditional Chinese Medicine, Hypogymnia hypotrypa is used for "dim vision, bleeding from uterus, bleeding from external injury, chronic dermatitis, and sores." Hypogymnia flavida and H. hypotrypa serve as raw material in the preparation of antibiotics in China.

Species
About 90 species are recognized in the genus.

Hypogymnia alpina  – China; India; Nepal
Hypogymnia amplexa 
Hypogymnia arcuata  – widespread in Northern Hemisphere
Hypogymnia asahinae  – Japan
Hypogymnia austerodes  – Europe
Hypogymnia australica 
Hypogymnia beringiana  – Alaska; Russia
Hypogymnia billardierei 
Hypogymnia bitteri  – Asia; Europe
Hypogymnia bryophila  – Portugal
Hypogymnia bulbosa  – China; Taiwan
Hypogymnia canadensis  – North America
Hypogymnia capitata  – China
Hypogymnia castanea  – Alaska; Far East Russia
Hypogymnia congesta  – China
Hypogymnia crystallina  – Himalayas
Hypogymnia delavayi  – China
Hypogymnia dichroma  – American Cordillera
Hypogymnia diffractaica  – China
Hypogymnia discopruina – southwestern China
Hypogymnia duplicata 
Hypogymnia elgonensis  – Africa
Hypogymnia elongata 
Hypogymnia enteromorphoides 
Hypogymnia farinacea  – Europe
Hypogymnia fistulosa  – Aleutian Islands; other islands in the Bering Sea; Seward Peninsula
Hypogymnia flavida  – East Asia
Hypogymnia fragillima  – northeast Asia
Hypogymnia fujisanensis 
Hypogymnia gracilis 
Hypogymnia guadalupensis 
Hypogymnia hengduanensis  – Asia
Hypogymnia heterophylla  – North America
Hypogymnia hokkaidensis  – Japan
Hypogymnia hultenii 
Hypogymnia hypotrypa  – Asia
Hypogymnia imshaugii  – Alaska
Hypogymnia inactiva 
Hypogymnia incurvoides  – Europe
Hypogymnia inflata  – Africa
Hypogymnia irregularis  – Asia
Hypogymnia kangdingensis 
Hypogymnia kiboensis  – Africa
Hypogymnia kosciuskoensis  – Australia
Hypogymnia krogiae  – North America
Hypogymnia laccata  – southwest China
Hypogymnia laminisorediata  – Greece; Morocco
Hypogymnia laxa  – China
Hypogymnia lijiangensis  – China
Hypogymnia lugubris 
Hypogymnia lophyrea 
Hypogymnia macrospora  – China
Hypogymnia madeirensis 
Hypogymnia magnifica  – China
Hypogymnia metaphysodes  – Asia
Hypogymnia minilobata  – United States
Hypogymnia mollis  – North America
Hypogymnia mundata 
Hypogymnia nikkoensis 
Hypogymnia nitida  – China
Hypogymnia obscurata 
Hypogymnia occidentalis  – Oregon
Hypogymnia oceanica  – North America
Hypogymnia papilliformis  – Russian Far East; China
Hypogymnia pectinatula  – Java; Papua New Guinea; Philippines; North Borneo
Hypogymnia pendula  – China
Hypogymnia physodes  – widespread in Northern Hemisphere
Hypogymnia protea  – American Cordillera
Hypogymnia pruinoidea  – China
Hypogymnia pruinosa  – China
Hypogymnia pseudobitteriana  – Asia; Papua New Guinea
Hypogymnia pseudocyphellata  – China
Hypogymnia pseudoenteromorpha  – Japan
Hypogymnia pseudophysodes  – northeast Asia
Hypogymnia pseudopruinosa  – China
Hypogymnia pulchrilobata 
Hypogymnia pulverata 
Hypogymnia recurva  – North America
Hypogymnia rhodesiana  – Africa
Hypogymnia sachalinensis  – east Asia
Hypogymnia salsa  – American Cordillera
Hypogymnia saxicola  – China
Hypogymnia schizidiata 
Hypogymnia sikkimensis  – Sikkim, India
Hypogymnia sinica  – China
Hypogymnia stricta  – Asia
Hypogymnia subarticulata  – Asia
Hypogymnia subcrustacea 
Hypogymnia subduplicata 
Hypogymnia subfarinacea  – China
Hypogymnia submundata 
Hypogymnia subobscura  – Europe
Hypogymnia subphysodes 
Hypogymnia subpruinosa  – China
Hypogymnia subvittata 
Hypogymnia taiwanalpina  – Taiwan
Hypogymnia tasmanica 
Hypogymnia tavaresii  – Canary Islands
Hypogymnia tenuispora  – China
Hypogymnia thomsoniana  – Asia
Hypogymnia tubularis 
Hypogymnia tubulosa  – Europe
Hypogymnia tuckerae – Oregon & California
Hypogymnia turgidula 
Hypogymnia verruculosa – American Cordillera
Hypogymnia vittata  – Asia; Europe; North America 
Hypogymnia wattiana 
Hypogymnia wilfiana  – North America
Hypogymnia yunnanensis  – China
Hypogymnia zeylanica  – Sri Lanka

Hypogymnia contains three species pairs: H. krogiae and the sorediate counterpart H. incurvoides, H. minilobata and the sorediate H. mollis, and H. lophyrea and the sorediate H. hultenii.

References

Cited literature

Lichen genera
Lecanorales genera
Taxa described in 1881
Taxa named by William Nylander (botanist)